Aristide Lapeyre (1899–1974) was a French anarchist activist, trade unionist, and free-thinker.

References

Further reading 

 Sylvie Knoerr-Saulière, Francis Kaigre, Jean-René Saulière dit André Arru, un individualiste solidaire (1911 – 1999), Les Amis d’André Arru, Libre pensée autonome, Centre International de Recherches sur l'Anarchisme (Lausanne), 2004.
 Cédric Guérin, Anarchisme français de 1950 à 1970, Mémoire de Maitrise en Histoire contemporaine sous la direction de Mr Vandenbussche, Villeneuve d’Ascq, Université Lille III, 2000.
 Les Cahiers des amis d'Aristide Lapeyre, Association des amis d'Aristide Lapeyre, semestriel, n°1, September 1985. Sudoc : notice. BNF : notice.

1899 births
1974 deaths
French anarchists
People from Gers